A Category 5 Atlantic hurricane is a tropical cyclone that reaches Category 5 intensity on the Saffir–Simpson hurricane wind scale, within the Atlantic Ocean to the north of the equator. They are among the strongest tropical cyclones that can form on Earth, having 1-minute sustained wind speeds of at least . The United States National Hurricane Center currently estimates that a total of 38 tropical cyclones between 1851 and  have peaked as Category 5 hurricanes.

Background

Within the Atlantic Ocean to the north of the Equator, hurricanes are officially monitored by the United States's National Hurricane Center (NHC), however, other meteorological services, such as Météo-France, the United Kingdom's Met Office and Environment Canada also monitor the basin.

A total of 38 tropical cyclones have been estimated to have peaked as Category 5 hurricanes on the SSHWS, with the first occurrence recorded in 1924. No Category 5 hurricanes were observed officially before 1924. It can be presumed that earlier storms reached Category 5 strength over open waters, but the strongest winds were not measured. Although anemometer, a device used for measuring wind speed, was invented in 1846, during major hurricane strikes the instruments were often blown away or damaged, leaving the hurricane's peak intensity unrecorded. For example, as the Great Beaufort Hurricane of 1879 struck North Carolina, the anemometer cups were blown away when indicating .

, a reanalysis of weather data was ongoing by researchers who may upgrade or downgrade Atlantic hurricanes. For example, the 1825 Santa Ana hurricane is suspected to have reached Category 5 strength. Furthermore, paleotempestological research aims to identify past major hurricanes by comparing sedimentary evidence of recent and past hurricane strikes. For example, a "giant hurricane" significantly more powerful than Hurricane Hattie (Category 5) has been identified in Belizean sediment, having struck the region sometime before 1500.

Records

Officially, the decade with the most Category 5 hurricanes is 2000–2009, with eight Category 5 hurricanes having occurred: Isabel (2003), Ivan (2004), Emily (2005), Katrina (2005), Rita (2005), Wilma (2005), Dean (2007), and Felix (2007). The previous decades with the most Category 5 hurricanes were the 1930s and 1960s, with six occurring between 1930 and 1939. The most Category 5 hurricanes recorded in a single season is four, in 2005.

The most consecutive years to feature at least one Category 5 hurricane each is four, from 2016 to 2019. It was initially believed that 2020 also had a category 5 hurricane, however, post-season analysis revealed Hurricane Iota was only a category 4.

Nine Atlantic hurricanes—Camille, Allen, Andrew, Isabel, Ivan, Dean, Felix, Irma and Maria—reached Category 5 intensity on more than one occasion; that is, by reaching Category 5 intensity, weakening to a Category 4 status or lower, and then becoming a Category 5 hurricane again. Such hurricanes have their dates shown together. Camille, Andrew, Dean, Felix, Irma, and Maria each attained Category 5 status twice during their lifespans. Allen, Isabel, and Ivan reached Category 5 intensity on three separate occasions. The 1932 Cuba hurricane holds the record for the most time spent as a Category 5 hurricane (although it took place before satellite or aircraft reconnaissance, so this record may be somewhat suspect). Irma holds the record for the longest continuous span as a Category 5 storm in the satellite era.

Of the 37 Category 5 hurricanes that have been recorded in the Atlantic basin since reliable records began in 1851, 1 has been recorded in July, 8 in August, 21 in September, 6 in October, and 1 in November. There have been no officially recorded June or off-season Category 5 hurricanes.

The July and August Category 5 hurricanes reached their high intensities in both the Gulf of Mexico and the Caribbean. These are the areas most favorable for tropical cyclone development in those months.

September sees the most Category 5 hurricanes, with over half of the total. This coincides with the climatological peak of the Atlantic hurricane season, which occurs in early September. September Category 5s reached their strengths in any of the Gulf of Mexico, Caribbean, and open Atlantic. These places are where September tropical cyclones are likely to form. Many of these hurricanes are either Cape Verde hurricanes, which develop their strength by having a great deal of open water; or so-called Bahama busters, which intensify over the warm Loop Current in the Gulf of Mexico.

All but one of the Category 5 hurricanes in October and November (the exception being Michael) reached their intensities in the western Caribbean, a region that Atlantic hurricanes strongly gravitate toward late in the season. This is due to the climatology of the area, which sometimes has a high-altitude anticyclone that promotes rapid intensification late in the season, as well as warm waters.

Systems

Other systems

However, during their routine post-analysis best track process after the season, the NHC downgraded Iota to a Category 4 hurricane as a result of research, which suggested that there was a high bias in windspeeds derived from the Stepped Frequency Microwave Radiometer instrument. The 1947 Fort Lauderdale hurricane and Hurricane Dog (1950), Easy (1951), Cleo (1958), Donna (1960), Ethel (1960) and Carla (1961) were all previously considered to be Category 5 major hurricanes. However, the Atlantic hurricane reanalysis project found that the wind speeds associated with the systems were overestimated and downgraded them to either Category 3 or 4.

Listed by month

Landfalls

With the exception of Hurricane Lorenzo, which did not make landfall but still brought hurricane-force winds to the Azores, all Atlantic Category 5 hurricanes have made landfall at some location as a hurricane, and all but four of those (Carol, Esther, Mitch and Isabel) made landfall at some location at major hurricane strength. Most Category 5 hurricanes in the Atlantic make landfall because of their proximity to land in the Caribbean and Gulf of Mexico, where the usual synoptic weather patterns carry them towards land, as opposed to the westward, oceanic mean track of Eastern Pacific hurricanes. Nineteen of the storms made landfall at least once while at Category 5 intensity; 2007 and 2017 are the only years in which two storms made landfall at this intensity.

Many of these systems made landfall shortly after weakening from a Category 5 hurricane. This weakening can be caused by dry air near land, shallower waters due to shelving, interaction with land, eyewall replacement cycles, increased vertical wind shear, or cooler waters near shore. In southern Florida, the return period for a Category 5 hurricane is roughly once every 50 years.

The following table lists these hurricanes by landfall intensity. As Lorenzo did not make landfall, it is omitted.

See also

Atlantic hurricane season
List of Atlantic hurricanes
List of Category 4 Atlantic hurricanes
List of Category 3 Atlantic hurricanes
List of Category 2 Atlantic hurricanes
List of Category 5 Pacific hurricanes
List of Category 4 Pacific hurricanes
List of Category 3 Pacific hurricanes
Pacific hurricane season
List of Pacific hurricanes

References

External links
 NHC web site

List
Lists of Atlantic hurricanes
Atlantic 5